Thomas de Betham (fl. 1302–1312) was an English politician.

He was a Member (MP) of the Parliament of England for Lancashire in 1311 and for Westmorland in 1302, 1308–1309 and 1311–1312.

References

13th-century births
14th-century deaths
English MPs 1311
English MPs 1302
English MPs 1308–09
Members of the Parliament of England (pre-1707) for Lancashire